Carolann "C.A." Davids (born 1971) is a South African writer and editor who is known for the novel The Blacks of Cape Town, published in 2013, and her short stories

Career and philosophy 
Born in 1971 in Cape Town, South Africa, Davids is a novelist, editor and writer. She previously worked in arts marketing as the marketing manager for the Baxter Theatre Centre at the University of Cape Town (UCT), and communications manager for the Alexander Kasser Theatre at Montclair State University in Montclair, New Jersey, USA. Before that she worked as an advertising and promotions manager for Levi Strauss SA.

Davids has contributed to publications such as Lapham's Quarterly, the Johannesburg Review of Books, the South African Sunday Times and Wasafiri, and her writing has appeared in anthologies such as Twist, an anthology of short stories by South African women (published by Struik, October 2006) and in African Pens: New Writing from Southern Africa (published by New Africa Books, April 2007). Davids has lived in Switzerland, the United States of America and Shanghai, China, and now resides on the edge of District Six in Cape Town, South Africa. She has an MA in creative writing from the University of Cape Town (UCT).

Her debut novel The Blacks of Cape Town received a positive critical reception in 2013.

Davids is as strong advocator of South African literature:

Recognition 
Davids has been shortlisted for the University of Johannesburg Debut Prize 2013, longlisted for the Sunday Times Fiction Prize 2013; longlisted for the inaugural Kwani? Manuscript Project, and shortlisted for the EU Literary Award in 2012.

Personal life
Davids lives with her husband and two children in Cape Town, South Africa.

Bibliography

Fiction
 The Blacks of Cape Town (2013), 
 How to be a Revolutionary (Verso Books, forthcoming, 2022)

Short stories
 Short story in Twist (2006)
 "Nostalgia" in African Pens: New Writing from Southern Africa  (2007)

References

1971 births
Living people
21st-century South African novelists
21st-century South African women writers
South African women novelists
University of Cape Town alumni